Charles Howe (born November 24, 1974) is an American professional boxer. He challenged for the WBC USNBC middleweight title.

Background
Howe was born and raised in Grelton, Ohio. He works as a boxing trainer in Toledo.

His brother is former heavyweight boxer Jamie "The Featherman" Howe.

Professional career
Howe turned professional in February 1993 in Chicago. In his debut Howe defeated fellow debutant Randall McHenry with a points victory over four rounds. After this initial victory Howe then suffered two defeats in 1993. Following two defeats so early in his career, Howe then left boxing and only return four years later when he knocked out Derrick Jones. Another year would pass before Howe would fight again. After having on one fight in almost five years Howe then returned to boxing in earnest in May 1998. Within a year Howe notched up five straight victories, including four by knockout.

In August 1999, Howe faced the then unbeaten Cornelius Bundrage, star of the ESPN reality show "Contender Season 2". Howe picked up a cut in the first round and Bundrage was docked a point for a low blow in the third. The fight went to the scorecard and Howe lost the decision by a split decision, with one of the judges giving the fight to Howe. After the split decision defeat to Bundrage, Howe went seven years and thirteen fights with a single defeat. This run included ten wins, with four knockouts, two draws and a no contest.

Joey Gilbert bout
On September 21, 2007, Howe faced Joey Gilbert, another star of The Contender, at Grand Sierra Resort, Reno, Nevada. Gilbert, 31, had a 16-1 record with 12 knockouts and was defending World Boxing Council-affiliated United States National Boxing Championships middleweight title against Howe. Howe got caught early in the fight and was down twice before the fight was stopped in the first round. After the fight Gilbert was suspended from boxing by the Nevada Athletic Commission when he tested positive in a urinalysis before and after his fight with Howe. Gilbert tested positive for steroid Stanozolol Metabolite, methamphetamine, amphetamine and three other substances -- nordiazepam, oxazepam and temazepam, all substances banned by the commission.

Following the result of the hearing this fight may be overturned to a "no contest".

Professional boxing record

References

External links
 

1974 births
Living people
People from Henry County, Ohio
Boxers from Ohio
American male boxers
Middleweight boxers